Curcumin is a bright yellow chemical produced by plants of the Curcuma longa species. It is the principal curcuminoid of turmeric (Curcuma longa), a member of the ginger family, Zingiberaceae. It is sold as a herbal supplement, cosmetics ingredient, food flavoring, and food coloring.

Chemically, curcumin is a diarylheptanoid, belonging to the group of curcuminoids, which are phenolic pigments responsible for the yellow color of turmeric.

Laboratory and clinical research have not confirmed any medical use for curcumin. It is difficult to study because it is both unstable and poorly bioavailable. It is unlikely to produce useful leads for drug development.

History
Curcumin was named in 1815 when Henri Auguste  Vogel and Pierre Joseph Pelletier reported the first isolation of a "yellow coloring-matter" from the rhizomes of turmeric. Later, it was found to be a mixture of resin and turmeric oil. In 1910, Milobedzka and Lampe reported the chemical structure of curcumin to be as diferuloylmethane. Later in 1913, the same group accomplished the synthesis of the compound.

Although curcumin has been used historically in Ayurvedic medicine, its potential for medicinal properties remains unproven as a therapy when used orally.

Uses

The most common applications are as an ingredient in dietary supplement, in cosmetics, as flavoring for foods, such as turmeric-flavored beverages in South and Southeast Asia, and as coloring for foods, such as curry powders, mustards, butters, cheeses. As a food additive for orange-yellow coloring in prepared foods, its E number is E 100 in the European Union. It is also approved by the U.S. FDA to be used as a food coloring in US.

Chemistry 

Curcumin incorporates a seven carbon linker and three major functional groups: an α,β-unsaturated β-diketone moiety and an aromatic O-methoxy-phenolic group. The aromatic ring systems, which are phenols, are connected by two α,β-unsaturated carbonyl groups. It is a diketone tautomer, existing in enolic form in organic solvents and in keto form in water. The diketones form stable enols and are readily deprotonated to form enolates; the α,β-unsaturated carbonyl group is a good Michael acceptor and undergoes nucleophilic addition. Because of its hydrophobic nature, curcumin is poorly soluble in water. However, it is easily soluble in organic solvents.

Curcumin is used as a complexometric indicator for boron. It reacts with boric acid to form a red-colored compound, rosocyanine.

Biosynthesis
The biosynthetic route of curcumin is uncertain. In 1973, Peter J. Roughley and Donald A. Whiting proposed two mechanisms for curcumin biosynthesis. The first mechanism involves a chain extension reaction by cinnamic acid and 5 malonyl-CoA molecules that eventually arylize into a curcuminoid. The second mechanism involves two cinnamate units coupled together by malonyl-CoA. Both use cinnamic acid as their starting point, which is derived from the amino acid phenylalanine.

Plant biosynthesis starting with cinnamic acid is rare compared to the more common p-coumaric acid. Only a few identified compounds, such as anigorufone and pinosylvin, build from cinnamic acid.

Pharmacology

Curcumin, which shows positive results in most drug discovery assays, is regarded as a false lead that medicinal chemists include among "pan-assay interference compounds". This attracts undue experimental attention while failing to advance as viable therapeutic or drug leads, although some derivatives of curcumin such as EF-24 have seen a significant amount of research.

Factors that limit the bioactivity of curcumin or its analogs include chemical instability, water insolubility, absence of potent and selective target activity, low bioavailability, limited tissue distribution, and extensive metabolism.  Very little curcumin escapes the GI tract and most is excreted in feces unchanged.  If curcumin enters plasma in reasonable amounts, there is a high risk of toxicity since it is promiscuous, and interacts with several proteins known to increase the risk of adverse effects, including hERG, cytochrome P450s, and glutathione S-transferase.

Safety
As a component of turmeric, curcumin may interact with prescription drugs and dietary supplements. In high amounts, it may be unsafe for women during pregnancy. It may cause side effects, such as nausea, diarrhea, hives, or dizziness. Between 2004 and 2022 there were ten cases of liver injury caused by cucumin herbal and dietary supplement. Curcumin is a contact allergen.

Two preliminary clinical studies in cancer patients consuming high doses of curcumin (up to 8 grams per day for 3–4 months) showed no toxicity, though some subjects reported mild nausea or diarrhea.

The intended use of curcumin as a food additive is generally recognized as safe by the U.S. Food and Drug Administration.

Medical research
Although curcumin has been assessed in numerous laboratory and clinical studies, it has no medical uses established by well-designed clinical research. According to a 2017 review of more than 120 studies, curcumin has not been successful in any clinical trial, leading the authors to conclude that "curcumin is an unstable, reactive, non-bioavailable compound and, therefore, a highly improbable lead". Curcumin exhibits numerous interference properties which may lead to misinterpretation of results.

The US government has supported US$150 million in research into curcumin through the National Center for Complementary and Integrative Health, and no support has been found for curcumin as a medical treatment. Curcumin has been identified by the U.S. Food and Drug Administration as a "fake cancer 'cure'".

Research fraud
Bharat Aggarwal was a cancer researcher at the University of Texas MD Anderson Cancer Center, who  had 29 papers retracted for research fraud.  Aggarwal's research had focused on potential anti-cancer properties of herbs and spices, particularly curcumin, and according to a March 2016 article in the Houston Chronicle, "attracted national media interest and laid the groundwork for ongoing clinical trials".  Aggarwal co-founded a company in 2004 called Curry Pharmaceuticals, based in Research Triangle Park, North Carolina, which was seeking to develop drugs based on synthetic analogs of curcumin. SignPath Pharma, a company seeking to develop liposomal formulations of curcumin, licensed three patents invented by Aggarwal related to that approach from MD Anderson in 2013.

Alternative medicine
Though there is no evidence for the safety or efficacy of using curcumin as a therapy, some alternative medicine practitioners give it intravenously, supposedly as a treatment for numerous diseases. In 2017, two serious cases of adverse events were reported from curcumin or turmeric products—one severe allergic reaction and one death—that were caused by administration of a curcumin-polyethylene glycol (PEG40) emulsion product by a naturopath. One treatment caused anaphylaxis leading to death.

Stability 
Decontamination of food by ionizing radiation, or food irradiation, is considered a safe and efficient process for elimination of pathogenic bacteria. Ionizing radiation treatment can be applied to either raw materials or ready to eat foods, with some countries, like the United States, imposing limitations on its use. In 2016, laboratory research established and compared the radiosensitivity of three organic food colorants including curcumin, carmine, and annatto to create data to be used for application whenever food products containing these food colors were to undergo the radiation process. The researchers used spectrophotometry and capillary electrophoresis to establish radiosensitivity of the three organic food colorants. Carmine samples were quite stable against radiation treatment, annatto showed limited stability, and curcumin was found to be stable at high temperatures and in acids, but unstable in alkaline conditions and in the presence of light.

References 

Curcuminoids
CYP2D6 inhibitors
E-number additives
Experimental medical treatments
Food colorings
Histone deacetylase inhibitors
Natural dyes
Vinylogous carboxylic acids